Paracapsulapagurus is an extinct monotypic genus of pagurid hermit crab from the Middle to Upper Maastrichtian in what is now Senegal.

Etymology
The generic name comes from the Greek word παρά (pará, meaning "next to, near") and Capsulapagurus, signifying the genus' close relationship with the respective pagurid Capsulapagurus. The specific name comes from the type locality of Popenguine.

References

Crustaceans described in 2016
Hermit crabs
Prehistoric crustacean genera